Thakkar Pheru (IAST: Ṭhakkura Pherū) was an author of books on mathematics, coins, and gems in Delhi. He was active between 1291 and  1347.

Alauddin Khalji recruited Ṭhakkura Pherū, a Shrimal Jain from Kannāṇā (modern Kalpana) in Haryana, as an expert on coins, metals and gems. For the benefit of his son Hemapal, he wrote several books on related subjects including Dravyaparīkṣa in 1318 based on his experience at the master mint, and the Ratnaparikṣa (Pkt. Rayaṇaparikkhā) in 1315 "having seen with my own eyes the vast collection of gems … in the treasury of Alāʾ al-Dīn Khaljī." He was continuously employed until the rule of Ghiasuddin Tughluq.

He is also known for his work on mathematics Ganitasārakaumudi.

References

Writers from Delhi
Coins of India
14th-century Indian writers
13th-century Indian Jains
14th-century Indian Jains
Indian Jain writers
Indian mathematicians